Aliabad-e Qoroq (also Romanized as ‘Alīābād-e Qoroq; also known as ‘Alīābād-e Pā’īn and Ali Abadé Sofla) is a village in Kushk-e Hezar Rural District, Beyza District, Sepidan County, Fars Province, Iran. At the 2006 census, its population was 303, in 79 families.

References 

Populated places in Beyza County